Delaney may refer to:

People
 Delaney (surname), including a list of people with the surname
 Delaney (given name), including a list of people with the given name

Places
 Delaney, Arkansas, an unincorporated community
 Delaney, West Virginia, an unincorporated community
 Delaney Creek, a stream in Indiana
 Delaney Flood Control Project, a body of water in Stow, Massachusetts
Rural localities in Queensland, Australia:
Delaneys Creek
Mount Delaney

Other uses
 Delaney clause, part of an amendment to the United States' Food, Drug, and Cosmetic Act of 1938
 Delaney's Donkey, song written by English composer William Hargreaves